Biphalin is a dimeric enkephalin endogenous peptide (Tyr-D-Ala-Gly-Phe-NH)2 composed of two tetrapeptides derived from enkephalins, connected 'tail-to-tail' by a hydrazide bridge. The presence of two distinct pharmacophores confers on biphalin  a high affinity for both μ and δ opioid receptors (with an EC50 of about 1-5 nM for both μ and δ receptors), therefore it has analgesic activity.
Biphalin presents a considerable antinociceptive profile. In fact, when administered intracerebroventricularly in mice, biphalin displays a potency almost 7-fold greater than that of the ultra-potent alkaloid agonist, etorphine and 7000-fold greater than morphine;  biphalin and morphine were found to be equipotent after intraperitoneal administration. The extraordinary in vivo potency shown by this compound is coupled with low side-effects, in particular, to produce no dependency in chronic use. For these reasons, several efforts have been carried out in order to obtain more information about structure-activity relationship (SAR). Results clearly indicate that, at least for μ receptor binding, the presence of two pharmacophores is not necessary; Tyr1 is indispensable for analgesic activity, while replacing Phe at the position 4 and 4' with non-aromatic, but lipophilic amino acids does not greatly change the binding properties and in general 4,4' positions are found to be important to design biphalin analogues with increased potency and modified μ/δ selectivity. The hydrazide linker is not fundamental for activity or binding, and it can be conveniently substituted by different conformationally constrained cycloaliphatic diamine linkers.

References 

Analgesics
Peptides
Opioids
Dimers (chemistry)